William Penney, Baron Penney (1909–1991) was an English mathematician.

William Penney may also refer to:
 William Penney, Lord Kinloch (1801–1872), Scottish judge
 William F. Penney (1862–1934), Newfoundland judge and politician

See also
 William Penny (1809–1892), Scottish whaling captain and explorer
Will Penny, 1968 western film